The 2019 W Series was the inaugural motor racing season of the W Series, an all-female Formula Regional-level racing series.

Driver selection
55 drivers were initially entered in a qualifying longlist for the 2019 season, with a further six added later on. An evaluation was held at the Wachauring in Melk, Austria over 26–28 January, with series judges—including David Coulthard, Alexander Wurz and Lyn St. James— selecting a shortlist of drivers that would get to test the Tatuus–Alfa Romeo T-318. The final stage held over 22–27 March, which saw additional fitness testing and data analysis alongside traditional testing, would decide the 18-driver line-up as well as four additional substitute drivers who would be on standby in the event of a regular driver's absence.

The evaluation format drew mixed opinions from the competitors. Eliminated driver Charlotte Poynting labelled the process "confusing" and that the judges "obviously weren't looking for the fastest drivers", whereas compatriot Caitlin Wood claimed the evaluation was "as fair as they could make it".

Eliminated drivers
Withdrew before evaluation

 Amna Al Qubaisi
 Michelle Gatting
 Angelique Germann
 Michelle Halder
 Carmen Jordá
 Sheena Monk
 Carrie Schreiner

Eliminated after evaluation

 Ayla Ågren
 Chelsea Angelo
 Carmen Boix
 Toni Breidinger
 Alessandra Brena
 Ivana Cetinich
 Veronika Cichá
 Courtney Crone
 Mira Erda
 Carlotta Fedeli
 Cassie Gannis
 Samin Gómez
 Fabienne Lanz
 Milla Mäkelä
 Alexandra Marinescu
 Marylin Niederhauser
 Lyubov Ozeretskovskaya
 Taegen Poles
 Charlotte Poynting
 Sharon Scolari
 Doreen Seidel
 Siti Shahkirah 
 Sneha Sharma
 Inès Taittinger
 Bruna Tomaselli
 Hanna Zellers

Eliminated after testing

  Natalie Decker
  Grace Gui
  Natalia Kowalska
  Stéphane Kox
  Francesca Linossi
  Milou Mets
  Shirley van der Lof
  Alexandra Whitley

Qualified drivers
All drivers competed with the Tatuus–Alfa Romeo F3 T-318 operated by Hitech GP and fitted with Hankook tires.

 – Megan Gilkes, normally a regular driver, was demoted to reserve driver duties at Round 4. Vivien Keszthelyi, normally a reserve driver, was promoted to regular driver duties at Round 4.

Calendar and results

A single championship race was held at six rounds of the Deutsche Tourenwagen Masters, with an additional non-championship race at TT Circuit Assen to test different event formats.

Championship standings

Scoring system 
Points were awarded to the top ten classified finishers as follows:

Drivers' Championship

Notes

References

External links
 

 
W Series
W Series
W Series